.crs or .CRS may refer to:

 .crs (file extension), an EAGLE filename extension for Gerber bottom solder cream files
 .crs (top-level domain), a top-level domain for Federated Co-operatives

See also
 CRS (disambiguation)